People Get Ready: Live at Ronnie Scott's is an album by Curtis Mayfield recorded at Ronnie Scott's Jazz Club.

Track listing
 “Little Child Runnin' Wild”
 “It's All Right”
 “People Get Ready”
 “Pusherman”
 “Freddie's Dead”
 “I'm So Proud”
 “Billy Jack”
 “We Got to Have Peace”
 “Move on Up”
 “To Be Invisible”

Personnel
Curtis Mayfield - guitar, vocals
Benny Scott - bass
Buzz Amato - keyboards
Lee Goodness - drums
Luis Stefanell - percussion

References

Curtis Mayfield live albums
1988 live albums
Albums recorded at Ronnie Scott's Jazz Club
Curtom Records live albums